Tales of the Unexpected was a science fiction, fantasy, and horror comics anthology series published by DC Comics from 1956 to 1968 for 104 issues.  It was later renamed The Unexpected although the numbering continued and it ended at issue #222 in 1982. The title was revived as a limited series in 2006.

Publication history

Original series 
In response to the restrictions imposed by the Comics Code Authority, DC began a new science-fiction series in 1956. The series featured artwork by Murphy Anderson, Gil Kane, and many others, with stories by John Broome, Gardner Fox, and additional writers. It was an anthology comic for many years, publishing a variety of science fiction stories. The series featured Space Ranger as of issue #40 and running through #82 (April–May 1964). Other features included the "Green Glob" (issues #83–98, 100, 102, 103) and "Automan" (issues #91, 94, 97).  The series' last issue as Tales of the Unexpected was #104 (December 1967–January 1968). As of issue #105 (February–March 1968), the title was shortened to The Unexpected.

2006 limited series 
DC revived the title for an eight-issue miniseries in 2006, focusing on the Crispus Allen incarnation of the Spectre, with a back-up series featuring Doctor Thirteen.

The back-up feature starred a team made up of Thirteen and his daughter Traci, I…Vampire, Genius Jones, Captain Fear, Infectious Lass, Anthro, the Primate Patrol, and the Haunted Tank. It was written by Brian Azzarello and drawn by Cliff Chiang.

Collected editions 
 Showcase Presents: Tales of the Unexpected collects Tales of the Unexpected #1–20, 512 pages, August 2012, 
 The Jack Kirby Omnibus Volume 1 includes stories from Tales of the Unexpected #13, 15–18, and 21–24, 304 pages, August 2011, 
 Crisis Aftermath: The Spectre includes the Spectre lead stories from Tales of the Unexpected vol. 2 #1–3, 144 pages, May 2007, 
 Spectre: Tales of the Unexpected collects the Spectre lead stories from Tales of the Unexpected vol. 2 #4–8, 128 pages, December 2007, 
 Doctor 13: Architecture and Mortality collects the Doctor 13 backup stories from Tales of the Unexpected vol. 2 #1–8, 144 pages, September 2007,

References

External links 

Tales of the Unexpected at Cover Browser
Tales of the Unexpected and Tales of the Unexpected vol. 2 at Mike's Amazing World of Comics

1956 comics debuts
1968 comics endings
2006 comics debuts
2006 comics endings
Comics anthologies
Comics by Arnold Drake
Comics by Brian Azzarello
Comics by Carl Wessler
Comics by George Kashdan
Comics by Jack Kirby
Comics magazines published in the United States
DC Comics titles
Defunct American comics
Defunct magazines published in the United States
Fantasy comics
Horror comics
Magazines disestablished in 1968
Magazines disestablished in 2006
Magazines established in 1956
Magazines established in 2006
Monthly magazines published in the United States
Science fiction comics